Guy Gerard Lapointe (born March 18, 1948) is a Canadian former professional ice hockey defenceman who played for the Montreal Canadiens, St. Louis Blues and Boston Bruins in the National Hockey League. He currently serves as Coordinator of Amateur Scouting with the NHL's Minnesota Wild.

Career
Along with defencemen Larry Robinson and Serge Savard, Lapointe was a member of the "Big Three" and played a key role in the Canadiens' winning the Stanley Cup six times in 1971, 1973, 1976, 1977, 1978, 1979. Nicknamed "Pointu" (a play on his name in French, where "pointu" carries most of the same meanings as "sharp" or "pointy" in English), Lapointe was famous for his sense of humour, powerful slapshot and brutal body-checks. One of his most famous pranks is probably the Vaseline coated handshake with then-Prime Minister Pierre Elliot Trudeau as he was visiting the Canadiens' locker room. He was traded to the St. Louis Blues in 1982 and signed with the Boston Bruins after the following season. He retired in 1984 following a series of injuries.

Following his retirement, Lapointe became general manager of the Longueuil Chevaliers of the Quebec Major Junior Hockey League, followed by a stint as associate coach with the Quebec Nordiques. He later served as an assistant coach and later as a scout with the Calgary Flames. He is currently the Chief Amateur scout with the Minnesota Wild, a position he has held since the franchise's inception.

Lapointe was inducted into the Hockey Hall of Fame in 1993. In 884 NHL games, Lapointe recorded 171 goals and 451 assists for 622 points. He still holds the Montreal Canadiens' record for most goals in a season for a defenceman (28), and most goals for a rookie defenceman (15). His number (#5) was retired by the Canadiens on November 8, 2014. Since the #5 is already retired on behalf of Bernie Geoffrion, they will both share the honour. He is the father of three children: Guy Jr., Stephanie and Jordan.

Career statistics

Regular season and playoffs

* Stanley Cup Champion.

Awards and accomplishments
NHL First All-Star Team (1973)
NHL Second All-Star Team (1975, 1976, 1977)
Played in  NHL All-Star Game (1973, 1975, 1976, 1977)

International

International play
Early into his NHL career, Lapointe was chosen to play in the historic 1972 Summit Series against the USSR. Lapointe accepted the invitation regardless of the fact his wife would give birth to his first child (Guy Jr.), during the series, while the team was in the USSR. He would compete internationally again for Canada in the 1976 Canada Cup and the 1979 Challenge Cup against the Soviets, which replaced that year's All-Star Game.

External links
 

1948 births
Living people
Boston Bruins players
Calgary Flames coaches
Calgary Flames scouts
Canadian ice hockey defencemen
French Quebecers
Hockey Hall of Fame inductees
Houston Apollos players
Ice hockey people from Montreal
Minnesota Wild scouts
Montreal Canadiens players
Montreal Junior Canadiens players
National Hockey League players with retired numbers
Quebec Nordiques coaches
St. Louis Blues players
Stanley Cup champions
Canadian ice hockey coaches